Anomis lophognatha is a moth of the family Erebidae first described by George Hampson in 1926.

It is found in Madagascar, Mauritius and Réunion.

References

Erebidae
Moths of Africa
Moths described in 1926